The 2014 Liga Nusantara Bali season is the first edition of Liga Nusantara Bali is a qualifying round of the 2014 Liga Nusantara.

The competition scheduled starts on 22 June 2014.

Teams
Liga Nusantara Bali will be followed by seven clubs namely Pro Kundalini, Putra Tresna, Persada Jembrana, Undiksha Singaraja, Perst Tabanan, PS Gianyar, dan Tunas Muda Ubud.

References

2014 in Indonesian football
Bali